The Mid-America Competing Band Directors Association (MACBDA) was a governing body and summer high school marching band competition circuit based in the Upper Midwest.

The circuit's competitive season traditionally began in June, and previously included field, parade, and concert band competitions hosted throughout the Midwestern United States. As of 2018, all competitive events were in Wisconsin and were limited to field band competitions, with occasional parade band competitions.

The 2019 circuit championship was at Perkins Stadium, in Whitewater, Wisconsin on July 14, 2019. Competitions were not held in 2020-21 due to the Covid pandemic. As of the 2022 season, the association and its web address at MACBDA.com are defunct.

The association had twenty-five member bands in 2008, but only five remained active .

About 
MACBDA was founded in 1972 by a group of high school band directors who wished to develop a summer competition circuit, similar to competitive junior drum corps. A summer season was preferable, as average autumn temperatures in the Midwest are often considered too cold for marching bands to perform successfully.

The circuit hosted member bands from Wisconsin, Illinois, Indiana, Iowa, Michigan, and Minnesota. Prior to 1991, bands competed in three activities; concert band, parade, and field band. , only five field bands remained active members of the circuit.

Governance 
The circuit was governed by a two executive officers, a President and Vice President. It is unclear how the circuit was organized, whether it be as a public benefit nonprofit corporation or as an unincorporated entity, or in which state the circuit was registered. MACBDA was not an IRS 501(c) tax exempt organization.

Archive and past scores 
No official archive of MACBDA's proceedings exists and very few caption recaps or scores have been preserved from past competitions. The official website only listed score summaries for the current year’s competitions, and no recaps.

Membership 
Competing bands were often attached to high school band programs, and supported by band booster clubs. Other bands were supported by nonprofit organizations and accepted performers from multiple schools or communities. All band members were required to be enrolled in high school, and were eligible to compete the summer following graduation. However, bands that pre-dated the founding of the circuit could accept members up to age 21.

Members as of 2021

Former members

Competitive season

Classification 
Bands were split between A and Open classes, based on the number of performing members. A third class, AA, was previously available according to results archived on Marching.com.

AAA Class was removed and replaced with Open Class between 2006 and 2007.

Field band adjudication 
MACBDA utilized a single-tier adjudication handbook for field band competitions. There were no adjustments or recommendations for scoring large and small bands. The annual Youth in Music Band Championships utilized the MACBDA scoring format.

Captions and rubric 
Scoring was based on two broad categories: Performance, and Effect. The categories were further divided into four reference criteria or captions, with each given a maximum value of 200 points, or up to 20 points when factored. Percussion and Auxiliary, or color guard, captions were also available, each given a maximum value of 100 points, or ten points when factored. The final score was tabulated by adding all captions, less any penalties.

One adjudicator was assigned to each caption, and one each to percussion and auxiliary. An additional adjudicator was responsible for timing and penalties. In addition to a tabulator, each competition required eight personnel.

MACBDA did not have captions for drum majors, twirling teams and majorettes, or dance teams. Performance excellence by a drum major was recognized by the Effect or Performance adjudicators where appropriate. Twirlers and dance teams would fall under the responsibility of the Auxiliary adjudicator. Almost all participating bands performed with a color guard team.

Placements and awards 
Placements and total scores were announced for each class following the last band's performance. Caption awards were also announced for "High Music Execution", "High Visual Execution", "High Music General Effect", "High Visual General Effect", "High Percussion" and "High Auxiliary'. The awards recognized the highest placing band in each caption, regardless of class.

A Drum Major excellence award was also announced, but did not affect the overall score for any of the competing bands.

Parade band adjudication 
Parade band adjudication fell under three captions: Marching, Effect, and Music. The two captions with the largest impact on a band's final score are Effect and Music, valued at up to 40 points each. Effect emphasizes overall ensemble performance, while music execution favors quality of tone and musical intonation.

Parade competitions could have up to nine judges, three per caption. Scores are averaged within captions, and then summed.

Past champions 
It is unclear when MACBDA championships were first hosted or which event was sanctioned as a championship prior to 1979. The following is an incomplete and unverified list of championship results:
<div style="overflow: auto;">

See also 
 Bands of America
 Northwest Association for Performing Arts
 Western Band Association
 Youth in Music

Notes

References

External links 
 
 

Marching band competitions
High school marching bands from the United States
Non-profit organizations based in the United States
Arts organizations established in 1972